Watching the sky and thinking a thought is a song with lyrics written by Ukrainian romantic poet Mykhailo Petrenko in 1841. It was set to music by Lyudmila Alexandrova. Vladislav Zaremba arranged this song for voice and piano. This song became one of the first two songs sung in space: this happened on August 12, 1962, on board the spacecraft "Vostok 3 and 4" when the first Ukrainian Soviet cosmonaut Pavlo Popovych from Ukraine, who had previously been fond of opera singing, performed it at the special request of Serhiy Korolyov, a prominent Soviet rocket engineer and designer of spacecraft from Ukraine, which sent the first satellite and the first people into space. 55 years after the first performance of Ukrainian song in space, on August 12, 2017, the introduction of this day of Ukrainian Song Day was initiated.

Prominent singers 

 Borys Gmyria video)
 Ivan Zhadan video)
 Ivan Kozlovsky (video)
 Anatoly Solovyanenko video)
 Yarolav Yevdokimov video)
 Yuri Gulyaev (video)
 Muslim Magomayev (video)
 Olexandr Ponomariov (video)
 Mark Reisen (video)
 Igor Borko (video)
 Soviet Army Song and Dance Ensemble video)
 Riga Etude Song Theater (video)

References

Literature 
 Михайло Петренко: Життя і творчість (художні тексти, дослідження, документи). // Упорядники О. Є. Петренко, О. О. Редчук. Оформлення Д. О. Редчук. «Фенікс». — К., 2013, 218 с.
 Поет-романтик Михайло Миколайович Петренко (1817—1862): Твори. Критичні та історико-літературні матеріали. // Упорядник О. Є. Петренко. "ПП "НВЦ «ПРОФІ». — К., 2015, 586 с.
 Михайло Петренко. Твори / Упорядник О. Є. Петренко. – К.: «Кий», 2017. – 104 с.
 Михайло Миколайович Петренко. 200 років безсмертя / Петренко О. Є., Шабанова В. М. – К.: «Кий», 2017. – 238 с.
 «Дивлюся на небо та й думку гадаю» в перекладах мовами світу / Упорядники Є. В. Букет, О. Є. Петренко. – Житомир: ФОП Євенок О. О., 2017. – 112 с. – (Бібліотека газети «Культура і життя»).

Music in space
Ukrainian songs